Millikan Way is a light rail station on the MAX Blue Line in Beaverton, Oregon. It is the 8th stop westbound on the Westside MAX.

The station is located in the southern central part of the Tektronix Howard Vollum Campus.  Other nearby business parks offer shuttle service to this station. One bus line serves this station and provides service to Washington Square Transit Center and Sunset Transit Center.

Bus line connections
This station is served by the following bus line:
62 – Murray Blvd

External links
Station information (with eastbound ID number) from TriMet
Station information (with westbound ID number) from TriMet
MAX Light Rail Stations – more general TriMet page
Park & Ride Locations – TriMet page

MAX Light Rail stations
MAX Blue Line
1998 establishments in Oregon
Railway stations in the United States opened in 1998
Transportation in Beaverton, Oregon
Buildings and structures in Beaverton, Oregon
Railway stations in Washington County, Oregon